WJTV (channel 12) is a television station in Jackson, Mississippi, United States, affiliated with CBS and The CW. Owned by Nexstar Media Group, the station has studios on TV Road in southwest Jackson, and its transmitter is located in Raymond, Mississippi.

WHLT (channel 22) in Hattiesburg operates as a semi-satellite of WJTV extending the CBS signal into the Pine Belt region of Mississippi. As such, it clears all network programming as provided through its parent and simulcasts most of WJTV's newscasts, but airs a separate offering of syndicated programming; there are also separate station identifications and local commercial inserts. Although WHLT maintains its own studios on US 49 in Hattiesburg, master control and some internal operations are based at WJTV's facilities.

History
WJTV signed-on January 20, 1953, as Mississippi's first television station, airing an analog signal on UHF channel 25. It was founded by Jackson's morning and afternoon newspapers—The Clarion-Ledger and the Jackson Daily News, respectively—and was a primary CBS affiliate and secondary DuMont Television Network affiliate.

One year later, on March 27, 1954, the Standard Life Insurance Company started WSLI-TV on VHF channel 12. That station was a primary ABC affiliate, owing to WSLI-AM's affiliation with that network, and provided Jackson residents with network coverage from the three major broadcast networks, since NBC affiliate WLBT (channel 3) had begun operation three months earlier. WSLI shared tower space with WJTV.

In 1955, the Hederman family and Standard Life Insurance Company opted to combine both stations' operations. On June 1, 1955, the two stations merged under WJTV's license, but using WSLI-TV's license on channel 12. WSLI radio remained on the air and became a sister to WJTV. The combined station was a primary CBS affiliate with secondary affiliations with ABC and DuMont. The new channel 12 also shared ABC programming with WLBT until 1970, when WAPT started operations on channel 16. WJTV was also affiliated with NBC and broadcast The Tonight Show Starring Johnny Carson until September 1966 when it was carried by NBC affiliate WLBT. (Carson had attended Millsaps College in Jackson.)

From 1977 until 1983, WJTV was owned by the Capitol Broadcasting Company (the same company which owned KNAZ-TV in Flagstaff, Arizona and KKTV in Colorado Springs, Colorado but unrelated to the Capitol Broadcasting Company of Raleigh, North Carolina). In 1983, it was sold to the News-Press & Gazette Company. Four years later, the station launched a semi-satellite for the Hattiesburg–Laurel area, WHLT. In 1993, NPG sold several of its stations, including WJTV and WHLT, to the first incarnation of New Vision Television. In turn, New Vision sold its entire stations group to Ellis Communications in 1995. Ellis was folded into Raycom Media the following year after it was bought out by a media group led by the Retirement Systems of Alabama (who bought AFLAC's broadcasting group a few months earlier).

In 1997, Raycom bought out Federal Broadcasting, owner of WHLT's rival station, WDAM-TV. Due to the presence of WHLT, this acquisition put Raycom in Federal Communications Commission (FCC) duopoly rules in the Hattiesburg–Laurel market. As a result, Raycom opted to keep the higher-rated WDAM and trade WJTV and WHLT (along with WSAV-TV in Savannah, Georgia that also had to be divested by Raycom due to its ownership of that station's rival WTOC-TV) to Media General in exchange for WTVR-TV in Richmond, Virginia (which had to be divested by Media General due to FCC same-market cross-ownership restrictions).

The trade left Raycom without a station in the Jackson market until 2006 when it acquired WLBT as part of its purchase of The Liberty Corporation. Its original digital transmitter was located at its studios on TV Road.

After an aborted merger plan with Meredith Corporation, Media General announced on January 27, 2016, that it was being acquired by Nexstar Broadcasting Group with the new company named "Nexstar Media Group". Because WNTZ-TV (owned by Nexstar) is considered part of the Alexandria DMA by the FCC (despite being licensed to Natchez, located in the Jackson market), Nexstar was not forced to sell either WNTZ or WJTV to comply with the ownership rules. The sale was completed on January 17, 2017.

WJTV-DT2
WJTV-DT2, branded as Mississippi's CW, is the CW-affiliated second digital subchannel of WJTV, broadcasting in high definition on virtual and VHF digital channel 12.2.

On October 1, 2013, WJTV returned programming from The CW to the Jackson market after a five-month absence due to former affiliate WRBJ-TV (channel 34)'s sale to the religious Trinity Broadcasting Network. WJTV placed the network on their second digital subchannel, replacing a still of the station's weather radar.

Programming

Syndicated programming
Syndicated programming on WJTV includes Dr. Phil, Family Feud, and Rachael Ray, among others. Syndicated programming on WJTV-DT2 includes The Doctors, 25 Words or Less, The Wendy Williams Show, Last Man Standing, and Family Guy, among others.

News operation
WHLT simulcasts its parent's weekday morning show and, beginning in December 2013, airs a full 30-minute 10 p.m. newscast produced within the WJTV studio that features stories submitted by WHLT reporters. The 10 p.m. newscast is anchored by WJTV personalities Melanie Christopher, Byron Brown, and chief meteorologist Ken South, and is specially produced for the Hattiesburg market.

The Hattiesburg station will sometimes share video footage with its parent when providing relevant, regional coverage of Mississippi. In this role, WHLT essentially acts as a bureau for WJTV. At some point in spring 2012, WJTV upgraded local news production to 16:9 enhanced definition widescreen.

Technical information

Subchannels
The station's digital signal is multiplexed:

Analog-to-digital conversion
WJTV shut down its analog signal, over VHF channel 12, on June 12, 2009, as part of the federally mandated transition from analog to digital television. The station's digital signal relocated from its pre-transition UHF channel 52, which was among the high band UHF channels (52–69) that were removed from broadcasting use as a result of the transition, to its analog-era VHF channel 12.

References

External links

WJTV-DT2 The CW

Television channels and stations established in 1953
JTV
Mass media in Jackson, Mississippi
CBS network affiliates
Ion Television affiliates
Court TV affiliates
Nexstar Media Group
1953 establishments in Mississippi